Filicollis is a genus of parasitic worms belonging to the family Polymorphidae.

The species of this genus are found in Europe and Northern America.

Species:

Filicollis anatis 
Filicollis trophimenkoi

References

Polymorphidae
Acanthocephala genera